The SCW Junior Heavyweight Championship was a professional wrestling championship in Steel City Wrestling (SCW). The title was the top junior heavyweight championship of the SCW promotion. It was the second singles championship established in SCW, having been introduced in 1994, in the finals of a four-man tournament.

The inaugural champion was Lord Zoltan, who defeated Scotty McKeever in a tournament final on October 8, 1994 to become the first SCW Junior Heavyweight Champion. No wrestler held the title more than once. At 1,219 days, Zoltan's first and only reign is the longest in the title's history. Reckless Youth's reign was the shortest in the history of the title at 56 days. Overall, there have been 4 reigns shared between 4 wrestlers, with one vacancy, and 1 deactivation.

Title history
Key

List of combined reigns

References
General

Specific

External links
SCW Junior Heavyweight Championship at Cagematch.net
SCW Junior Heavyweight Championship at Wrestlingdata.com

Junior heavyweight wrestling championships
Steel City Wrestling